Thameslink is a major British railway route running in South East England

Related to the above railway route, Thameslink may also refer to:
 Govia Thameslink Railway, train operating company that has operated services under the Thameslink brand since 2014
 Thameslink Programme, a major railway project to upgrade the route
 Thameslink, Southern and Great Northern, the name of the franchise
 Thameslink (train operating company 1997–2006), a former train operating company